Sebastião Ricardo Drubscky de Campos (born 20 January 1962), known as Ricardo Drubscky, is a Brazilian football manager.

Career
Born in Belo Horizonte, Minas Gerais, Drubscky began his career as a fitness coach of Cruzeiro's youth setup in 1986. The following year he held the same role at the first team, but left the club in 1988.

Drubscky's first senior team was Universidad Católica del Ecuador in 1996, after winning the year's Copa São Paulo de Futebol Júnior with América Mineiro. In 1997, after a spell with Mamoré, he returned to América as a first-team manager.

After managerial roles with Democrata-GV, Villa Nova, Ipiranga-MG, Araçatuba, Valeriodoce, Ipatinga, Botafogo-PB and Caxias, Drubscky was a director of football at Atlético Mineiro and América. On 7 May 2005, he was named manager of first club Cruzeiro's youth setup.

On 14 June 2008, Drubscky returned to Ipatinga, with the side now in the Série A. Sacked on 21 August, he was subsequently named Atlético Paranaense's youth coordinator.

Drubscky was named at the helm of Monte Azul on 20 October 2010. The following 31 May, he took over Tupi, and led the club to a Série D title.

On 20 November 2011, Drubscky was appointed manager of Volta Redonda for the 2012 campaign. The following 12 June, he returned to Atlético Paranaense, now as first-team manager.

Drubscky was demoted to assistant after the arrival of Jorginho, but returned to his previous role in August 2012 after the latter's dismissal. He achieved promotion to the first division, but was himself sacked on 8 July 2013.

Drubscky was subsequently in charge of Joinville, Criciúma, Paraná, Goiás and Vitória before being appointed at Fluminense on 24 March 2015. He was relieved from his duties at the latter on 20 May.

After managing Audax, Tupi and Anápolis, Drubscky returned to América on 20 October 2016, as a director of football. On 20 June 2018, he replaced departing Enderson Moreira as first-team manager.

Honours
América Mineiro
Copa São Paulo de Futebol Júnior: 1996

Botafogo-PB
Campeonato Paraibano: 2002

Tupi
Campeonato Brasileiro Série D: 2011

Atlético Paranaense
Marbella Cup: 2013

References

External links

1962 births
Living people
Sportspeople from Belo Horizonte
Brazilian football managers
Campeonato Brasileiro Série A managers
Campeonato Brasileiro Série B managers
Campeonato Brasileiro Série D managers
Esporte Clube Mamoré managers
América Futebol Clube (MG) managers
Esporte Clube Democrata managers
Villa Nova Atlético Clube managers
Associação Esportiva Araçatuba managers
Ipatinga Futebol Clube managers
Botafogo Futebol Clube (PB) managers
Atlético Monte Azul managers
Tupi Football Club managers
Volta Redonda Futebol Clube managers
Club Athletico Paranaense managers
Joinville Esporte Clube managers
Criciúma Esporte Clube managers
Paraná Clube managers
Goiás Esporte Clube managers
Esporte Clube Vitória managers
Fluminense FC managers
Anápolis Futebol Clube managers
Tombense Futebol Clube managers
Floresta Esporte Clube managers
C.D. Universidad Católica del Ecuador managers
Brazilian expatriate football managers
Expatriate football managers in Ecuador